Hoshaiah or Oshaya (Also spelled: Oshaia; , ; died ca. 350 CE) was a Jewish amora of the 3rd and 4th amoraic generations.

Biography
It is supposed that his colleague Hanina was his brother. They were lineal descendants from Eli the priest, which circumstance they assigned as reason for Johanan's failure to ordain them. For a living they plied the shoemaker's trade. Furthermore, the Talmud refers once to Hoshaiah and Hanina as rabbis (with the generic term Rav), when dealing with the laws differentiating magic as illusion and as wizardry. Hoshaiah and his colleague stand out as producing magic while studying Sefer Yetzirah, which is there considered neither illusion (aḥizat eynayim, literally "catching of the eyes") nor sorcery.

Hoshaiah and Hanina are also mentioned in connection with a certain bath-house, the ownership of which was contested by two persons, one of whom turned over the property as "hekdesh" (for sacred use), causing Hoshaiah, Hanina, and other rabbis to leave it.

On the day Hoshaiah died, it is claimed, the largest date-palm in Tiberias was uprooted and fell.

Modern figures by this name
Since the late twentieth century, a Jewish illusionist borrowed this name in being called Oshaya the Seer, obviously inspired by the famous amora and his skills in the magical arts.

References

 It has the following bibliography:
Yuḥasin. ed. Filipowski, p. 118, London, 1857;
Heilprin, Seder ha-Dorot, ii.36, Warsaw, 1878;
Frankel, Mebo, p. 75, Breslau, 1870;
Jolles, Bet Wa'ad, p. 20a, Cracow, 1884;
Bacher, Ag. Pal. Amor. iii.565.

350s deaths
Talmud rabbis of the Land of Israel
4th-century rabbis
Year of birth unknown